The first presidential election in Argentine history took place on February 7, 1826, to choose the first President of the United Provinces of the Rio de la Plata, in the context of the Brazil War. The election was held indirectly, through the Congress of the United Provinces, which acted as an Electoral College and without representation of all provinces. Bernardino Rivadavia, from the Unitarian Party, was the only candidate, being elected with 35 votes in favor and 3 against, and sworn in the following day. His appointment, due to the fact that a national constitution had not yet been sanctioned or approved, was questioned and viewed with suspicion by several provinces.

See also 

 History of Argentina
 United Provinces of South America

Notes

1826 elections in South America
1826 in Argentina
1854